This is the list of lakes that form the St. Johns River in Florida, the state's longest river, starting with the origin.

Blue Cypress Lake
Lake Hell 'n Blazes 
Sawgrass Lake
Lake Washington
Lake Winder
Lake Poinsett
 Ruth Lake
Puzzle Lake
Lake Harney
Lake Jesup
Lake Monroe
Lake Dexter
Lake George
Doctors Lake-linked by channel

See also 

Atlantic Ocean

St. Johns River
Lakes
St. Johns River